Olev Träss (born 1931 in Tartu) is an Estonian chemist who lives in Canada. He is a promoter of Estonian community in Canada.

He has graduated from Massachusetts Institute of Technology.

He is one of the founders of Tartu Institute (:et) in Toronto, and also its president. He is also one of the founder of Kotkajärv Forest University (:et).

In 2007 he was awarded with Order of the White Star, IV class.

In 2021 he received Aino Järvesoo prize for his contribution to sustaining and developing Estonian culture and language abroad.

References

External links
 Eesti lugu. Olev Träss - Eesti teadlane (21.10.2017), radio program at Vikerraadio

Living people
1931 births
Estonian chemists
Recipients of the Order of the White Star, 4th Class
Estonian emigrants to Canada
Estonian World War II refugees
People from Tartu